Jeffrey Levine may refer to:

 Jeffrey Levine (poet), American poet, publisher, musician, and attorney
 Jeffrey D. Levine (born 1955), United States Ambassador to Estonia
 Jeffrey Levine (composer) (born 1942), American composer and double-bassist